The Indiana Law Enforcement and Firefighters Memorial, officially titled the Indiana Law Enforcement and Fire Fighters Memorial, is a public artwork and memorial dedicated to law enforcement officers and firefighters from Indiana who lost their lives in the line of duty. Its design and construction was the collaborative effort of a broad range of professionals, including architects, landscapers, engineers, and construction experts. The memorial is located adjacent to the Indiana Government Center North, on the northwest corner of Bicentennial Plaza and Senate Avenue in downtown Indianapolis, Indiana, United States. The memorial was dedicated on June 6, 2001, after ten months of planning and construction. The dedication was held three days before the opening of the World Police and Fire Games that were held in Indianapolis that year.

Description

A sign marks the pathway to the memorial, which is in a park-like setting with many trees and benches. A fountain in the shape of the Indiana state flag is featured in the center of the memorial.

The proper right side of the memorial area is designated to honor law enforcement officers killed in the line of duty. The bronze medallion atop the Indiana Limestone pylon displays a uniformed police officer standing next to Saint Michael Archangel, patron of police. In the center of each of the two pylons are laminated books which visitors can search for the names of individuals who are memorialized on the monument, and directions for locating the name. Behind the pylon stand eleven groups of three gray granite panels (thirty-three panels total) with the names of Indiana police officers who have died in the line of duty etched into the granite.

To the proper left is the area designated to honor firefighters who were killed in the line of duty. A bronze medallion depicting the Firefighter shield sits atop the pylon to the proper left. Behind the pylon stand eleven groups of three gray granite panels (thirty-three panels total) with the names of Indiana firefighters who have died in the line of duty etched into the granite. The law enforcement and firefighter panels mirror one another and create a semicircle.

This memorial is a series of pieces, constructed from gray granite, Indiana Limestone, and bronze. The only easily identifiable inscriptions are part of the memorial itself, including the names of the deceased that are etched into the granite, as well as words of dedication on the pylons. There are no visible artist or foundry marks.

Historical information
Under the direction of the State of Indiana and the Indiana Firefighters Memorial Committee, the planning, design, and construction for the Indiana Law Enforcement and Fire Fighters Memorial commenced in August 2000. The work was completed and unveiled on June 6, 2001, just three days prior to the opening ceremonies of the World Police and Fire Games that were being held in Indianapolis that year.

The price for the construction of the memorial was approximately $1 million.

In 2002, Glenroy Construction was awarded the BKD Governor's Award for their work on the memorial. This award is granted for exceeding the award criteria and for a structure that provides a positive impact on the community.

Artist
The design and construction of the Indiana Law Enforcement and Fire Fighters Memorial was a collaborative effort. Indiana based company Glenroy Construction Company; Ken Boyce of Ratio Architects; Patrick Brunner, architect; and Bonnie Sheridan Coghlan, architect, and Indianapolis based Becker Landscape participated in the design and construction of the memorial.

See also
 List of firefighting monuments and memorials
 Vietnam Veterans Memorial Wall

References

External links
Directory of fallen law enforcement officers — Indiana Law Enforcement Memorial
Directory of fallen firefighters — Professional Firefighters Union of Indiana
More images of the memorial on Flickr
Overview and map of Indiana Law Enforcement and Firefighters Memorial.

2001 sculptures
Outdoor sculptures in Indianapolis
Monuments and memorials in Indiana
Law enforcement in Indiana
Firefighting in Indiana
Firefighting memorials
Firefighting in the United States
Indiana Statehouse Public Art Collection
2001 establishments in Indiana
Limestone sculptures in Indiana
Bronze sculptures in Indiana
Law enforcement memorials